The Matabele War may refer to:

The First Matabele War (1893)
The Second Matabele War (1896–97); also called the Matabeleland Rebellion or the First Chimurenga